Our Mother of Sorrows Roman Catholic Church Complex is a historic former Roman Catholic church complex located at Greece in Monroe County, New York.  The complex consists of the Romanesue Revival style brick church (ca.1858–1878) and the adjacent community cemetery (1823–ca.1900).  The church was converted for use as a public library.

It was listed on the National Register of Historic Places in 1989.

References

External links

Our Mother of Sorrows website

Churches on the National Register of Historic Places in New York (state)
Roman Catholic churches in New York (state)
Roman Catholic churches completed in 1878
19th-century Roman Catholic church buildings in the United States
Churches in Monroe County, New York
National Register of Historic Places in Monroe County, New York